In the spinal cord, the most lateral of the bundles of the ventral nerve roots is generally taken as a dividing line that separates the antero-lateral region into two parts: an anterior funiculus (or anterior column), between the anterior median fissure and the most lateral of the ventral nerve roots; and a lateral funiculus, between the exit of these roots and the posterolateral sulcus.

References 

Central nervous system